Mission Bay High School (MBHS), is a public high school located in the San Diego, California community of Pacific Beach. It is a magnet school with emphasis on Academic Studies. 
In Fall 2006, Mission Bay introduced International Baccalaureate courses that students could take to help them get their I.B. diploma.

The Mission Bay High jazz program is home to the Award-winning and touring Mission Bay Preservationists, as well as the Mission Bay Mambo Orchestra, the only youth-Latin big band in California. The music program also includes a concert band, string orchestra, full-size symphonic orchestra, swing and concert choirs, and the aforementioned 2 jazz-bands. The music program has been taught by Jean-Paul Balmat since 2006, becoming Mission Bay High's music educator after a 2-year hiatus from 2004-2006.

The racial make-up of Mission Bay High is American Indian - 13 (1%), Asian - 174 (10%), Black - 242 (14%,) Hispanic - 876 (52%), White - 369 (22%). Approximately 83% of the school is bused from other parts of San Diego such as Logan Heights, Sherman Heights, Shelltown, Mount Hope, Lincoln Park, Valencia Park, Encanto, Skyline, Paradise Hills, City Heights, and Scripps Ranch.

Notable alumni 
Adia Barnes, basketball player and coach, holder of national high school record for blocks and all-time scoring and rebounding record for the University of Arizona, now head coach of the Arizona Wildcats
Jean Marc Barr, French-American actor
Dillon Baxter, USC football player
Matt Bush, baseball player, pitcher for the Texas Rangers, No. 1 overall pick of the 2004 Major League Baseball Draft
Ron Bushy, drummer for the band Iron Butterfly
Amir Derakh (originally Amir Davidson), guitarist with bands Rough Cutt, Orgy, Dead by Sunrise, and Julien-K
Boogie Ellis, college basketball player with the USC Trojans
Arian Foster, collegiate football star for the Tennessee Volunteers, running back for the NFL’s Houston Texans and Miami Dolphins
Skip Frye, surfer
Mike Fuentes, drummer of Pierce the Veil
Vic Fuentes, singer and guitarist of Pierce the Veil
Rosie Hamlin, singer, Rosie and the Originals
Mike Houghton, selected 2002 NFL Draft by the Green Bay Packers, attended the San Diego State University
Charles Jock, Track and Field Olympian, 2012 NCAA D1 Champion 800m
Tawny Kitaen, actress (attended, but did not graduate)
Shawn Kerri, artist
Jeanne Lenhart, senior Olympian, amateur volleyball player, senior pageant winner 
Matt Maslowski, former NFL player with the Los Angeles Rams and Chicago Bears
Casey Nicholaw, Broadway director, choreographer and actor
Jason Parker, UFL player, California Redwoods
Kevin Reese, Major League Baseball player, New York Yankees
Betsy Russell, film and television actress
Richard R. Schrock, chemist and Nobel laureate
Pat Shea, former NFL player
Joel Skinner, Major League Baseball player and coach of the Cleveland Indians
Marcus Smith, former NFL player
Karen Hantze Susman, Wimbledon champion
Tom Warren, 1979 Ironman champion, businessman
Frank Zappa, musician (attended, but did not graduate)

Notable faculty 
Tony Corbin, former professional football player.

See also
Primary and secondary schools in San Diego, California

References

 Mission Bay Jazz Band Website

External links 
Mission Bay High School

Educational institutions established in 1953
High schools in San Diego
International Baccalaureate schools in California
Public high schools in California
Magnet schools in California
1953 establishments in California